Donna Caponi-Byrnes (born January 29, 1945) is an American LPGA Tour professional golfer. She became a member of the tour in 1965 and won four major championships and 24 LPGA Tour career events.  She is a member of the World Golf Hall of Fame.

Amateur career
Caponi was born in Detroit, Michigan. She started playing golf at the age of 5. She learned golf from her father, Harry, and won the Los Angeles Junior title in 1956. She tied for 21st as an amateur at the 1964 Hillside House Ladies' Open on the LPGA Tour.

Professional career
Caponi joined the LPGA Tour in 1965. She won her first tournament in 1969 at the U.S. Women's Open. She is one of 14 players to make the U.S. Women’s Open her first LPGA victory. She would repeat as champion in 1970. Only Mickey Wright had ever won back-to-back U.S. Women's Opens before Caponi, who also matched Wright's 72-hole scoring record of 287. She would go on to win a total of 24 events on the LPGA Tour, including four major championships.

Caponi was named Female Player of the Year by Golf Writers Association of America in 1981. She finished in the top ten on the money list ten times between 1968 and 1981, including second-place finishes in 1976 and 1980. She retired from full-time competition in 1988. She was inducted into the World Golf Hall of Fame in 2001. In 2009, she was the recipient of the PGA First Lady of Golf Award.

She is currently an announcer on the Golf Channel, covering the Champions Tour.

Personal life
From 1971 to 1981, Caponi was married to Ken Young and was known as Donna Caponi Young. After her divorce in 1981, she changed her name back to Donna Caponi. She married her longtime boyfriend Edward "Ted" Byrnes on July 29, 2006, and changed her name to Donna Caponi-Byrnes.

Professional wins (29)

LPGA Tour wins (24)

Note: Caponi won the Peter Jackson Classic (which became the du Maurier Classic) and the Colgate-Dinah Shore Winner's Circle (now known as the Kraft Nabisco Championship) before they became major championships.

LPGA Tour playoff record (3–5)

Other wins (5)
1975 Colgate European Open
1976 Wills Qantas Australian Ladies Open
1978 Ping Classic Team Championship (with Kathy Whitworth)
1980 Portland Ping Team Championship (with Kathy Whitworth)
1981 Portland Ping Team Championship (with Kathy Whitworth)

Major championships

Wins (4)

See also
List of golfers with most LPGA Tour wins
List of golfers with most LPGA major championship wins

References

External links

American female golfers
LPGA Tour golfers
Winners of LPGA major golf championships
World Golf Hall of Fame inductees
Women sports announcers
Golfers from Detroit
Golfers from Tampa, Florida
1945 births
Living people
21st-century American women